Start Lublin, more commonly known as Polski Cukier Pszczółka Start Lublin because of sponsporship reasons, is a Polish basketball club based in Lublin. The team plays in the Polish Basketball League (PLK) since 2014. Its home arena is the Globus, which has places for 5,000 people. The basketball team is a part of MKS Start Lublin, which also holds chess and athletics sections.

History
MKS Start Lublin was founded in 1953, along with the basketball team. After seven years of existence, Start promoted to the Polish Basketball League (PLK), the national highest league. In the 1964–65 season, Start captured its first bronze medal. In 1978, Start was the first Polish club to sign an African-American played in Kent Washington. Washington was named PLK Most Valuable Player in 1980.

In the 2002–03 season, Start returned to the PLK after winning the First Division. After two years, the team relegated once again. 

In the summer of 2014, Start Lublin received a wild card from the PLK because of the expansion from 12 to 16 teams.

Lublin had its most successful season in the 2019–20 PLK season, which was curtailed due to the COVID-19 pandemic. When the season was ended, the team was in second place with a 17–5 record. As such, it qualified for a European competition for the first time in the 2020–21 Basketball Champions League.

Honours
Polish Basketball League
 Runners-up (1): 2019–20
 Bronze medal (3): 1964–65, 1978–79, 1979–80
Polish Basketball Cup
 Runners-up (2): 2022, 2023

Sponsorship names
Due to sponsorship reasons, the club has been known by several names:

Season by season

Players

Current roster

Individual awards
PLK Most Valuable Player
Kent Washington – 1980

Notable players
Chavaughn Lewis (born 1993), basketball player for Hapoel Galil Elyon of the Israeli Basketball Premier League
Devonte Upson (born 1993), basketball player in the Israeli Basketball Premier League

References

Basketball teams in Poland
Sport in Lublin
Basketball teams established in 1953